Rusty Malinoski, known as Bone crusher, is a Canadian professional wakeboarder who was the first athlete to successfully land a 1080° in a wakeboard competition.  

While Parks Bonifay and Danny Harf had both been recorded landing 1080s before, Malinoski was the first one to do it during an official pro tour event. He is also the first wakeboarder to land a 1080 twice.  Over the years, Malinoski has earned the nickname "Bone crusher" because of his powerful riding style.   Malinoski won the Pro Men’s U.S. Pro-Am Championship in 2005.   As of 2012 Rusty Malinoski had finished every season in the top ten.  

Malinoski was featured in wakeboarding DVDs such as Bent Felix, The Butter Effect and Slick City.

See also
Parks Bonifay

References

1983 births
Wakeboarders
Living people
Sportspeople from Humboldt, Saskatchewan
Sportspeople from Saskatchewan
Pan American Games medalists in water skiing
Pan American Games gold medalists for Canada
Water skiers at the 2015 Pan American Games
Medalists at the 2015 Pan American Games